Und River is a river in western India in Gujarat whose origin is Lodhika Ridge. Its basin has a maximum length of 80 km.

References

Rivers of Gujarat
Rivers of India